Dwarf salamander may refer to five species of salamander in the genus Eurycea, all endemic to the United States and all of which were previously assigned to a single species (Eurycea quadridigitata):

 Chamberlain's dwarf salamander (Eurycea chamberlaini), found only in the Carolinas
 Hillis's dwarf salamander (Eurycea hillisi), found in interior regions of southern Alabama and Georgia, and the central Florida panhandle
 Western dwarf salamander (Eurycea paludicola), found from Mississippi west to eastern Texas
 Southeastern dwarf salamander (Eurycea quadridigitata), found from southern North Carolina south to Florida, west to Louisiana
 Bog dwarf salamander (Eurycea sphagnicola), found in southern Mississippi, Alabama, and the far western Florida panhandle

Set index articles on animal common names